Ihram (from the triconsonantal root Ḥ-R-M) is, in Islam, a sacred state which a Muslim must enter in order to perform the major pilgrimage (Ḥajj) or the minor pilgrimage (ʿUmrah). A pilgrim must enter into this state before crossing the pilgrimage boundary, known as Mīqāt, by performing the cleansing rituals and wearing the prescribed attire.

Restrictions

Wearing 
A man in the state of ihram must not tie any knots or wear any stitched items. Sandals and flip flops must not be stitched either and should allow the ankle and back of foot to be exposed (some other schools of thought also agree that the front of the foot must be shown as well). 

Men are also not allowed to cover the head or part of it by using a songkok, keffiyeh, turban, ihram cloth, etc. in the state of ihram.

In the state of ihram, women and men are not allowed to wear gloves.

Scents 
Whilst in the state of ihram, a Muslim must not use any scents on the body or on the robes. If the robe has been fouled by najas (dirty) material or has been wiped, rubbed or touched by scented liquids (intentionally), then a new iḥrām clothing must be worn, or the Umrah or Hajj will be invalid.

Self-grooming 
Aside from being as clean (purified) as they are for prayer, male Muslims are expected to cut their nails, and trim their hair and beards. They must also not wear any scent, including deodorant. They have to wear ihram clothing, which is a white, seamless garment. Many also shave their head as this is considered hygienic. Most will wait to shave their heads until after they have finished Umrah or Hajj, as this is a requirement to leave the state of ihram. Female Muslims are also expected to be clean. During the pilgrimage, sexual activity, smoking, and swearing are also forbidden.

Environment 

It is forbidden for every pilgrim of Hajj and Umrah when in his Ihram men and women to uproot, cut, break and grind the branches of trees and trees that are planted alive and growing in the Holy Land. This prohibition is also not allowed by any person present in the Holy Land (al-Haramain: Makkah, Madinah, Masyair Haram: Arafah, Muzdalifah and Mina, Jerusalem: Al-Aqsa Mosque). This is because, the trees that thrive in the Holy Land are the "Blessed Trees".

It is forbidden for every pilgrim of Hajj and Umrah while in his Ihram men and women to hunt, shoot, kill, sacrifice, capture, confine, destroy and abuse any land animal. This prohibition applies to every type of land animal, bird and insect other than marine animals.

If a person steps on or kills small animals/insects such as small black ants, grasshoppers, etc. by accident then he is not considered guilty but it is very necessary to pay the Dam according to the value of the insects killed.

A person is allowed to kill animals and insects that may cause him harm and endanger his sight and that of other pilgrims if he continues to leave it while in Ihram such as mosquitoes, snakes, scorpions and spiders without being subject to Dam, although it is preferable to only drive away the insect or animal first if possible.

Sexual activity 
Every pilgrim (male and female) of Hajj or Umrah who is in Ihram is prohibited from performing mukaddimah (Beginning/Introduction) to sexual intercourse whether in the form of words, deeds, body gestures or the like. However, it is not imposed on Dam for those who are in Ihram who ejaculate due to seeing women and fantasizing about sex. Husband and wife or mahram are allowed to hold hands (not on the genital) while in Ihram provided they are in a situation where it is called "Masyaqqah" that is: Needs with No Lust (want to have sex). Husband and wife or mahram are allowed to hug for the purpose of desperate needs (not wanting to have sex) as well as security purposes such as pain etc. while in Ihram provided they need to be in a state where it is called "Masyaqqah" namely: Needs with No Lust (want to have sex) .

The act of sexual intercourse is something that is strictly forbidden and is capable of ruining one's Hajj, especially when the congregation is in a state of Ihram before Tahallul Awwal. The state of this prohibition is in a position where:

 Deliberately together (willingly) having intercourse (sex) without being forced
 Know the law of having sex while performing Ihram is Haram
 Already Mumaiyiz (knows how to distinguish between good and bad deeds)

When it turns out that the husband and wife have done the above act, then it is obligatory for them to continue the rest of the Hajj that has not been performed to be performed as perfectly as possible until it is completed, and then immediately qada replace the Hajj (for the second time) even if it is just the Hajj of Sunnah (generally the Hajj performed for the second time and so on, is the Hajj that is in the category of Sunnah only) unless there is an illness between the two. Only the husband is subject to Dam (Order and Justice). Both (husband and wife) need to ask for forgiveness from Allah SWT as well. However, if there is another sexual intercourse (which is connected with it) after sexual intercourse that spoils the Hajj for the first time, then the husband is subject to Dam (Takhyir and Taqdir). If sexual intercourse occurs after Tahallul Awwal but before Tahallul Thani, the Hajj is not void, but the husband is subject to Dam (Takhyir and Taqdir). Husbands and wives are allowed to have sexual intercourse after (both types of Tahallul Awwal and Tahallul Thani) have been completed properly. However, it is more afdhal (better and encouraged) to postpone the act until all the pillars and activities of Hajj are completed.

All acts of marrying, marrying or accepting a marriage representative are strictly prohibited when the congregation is in a state of Ihram. In fact, pre-marital and post-marital activities such as merisik, betrothal and marriage are illegal. Marriage contract is also considered Haram. However, the people involved are not subject to Dam.

When flying 

When flying on pilgrimage, appropriate measures are usually taken to assure that the pilgrim will be in the state of ihram when flying above or alongside the stations of miqat. For this reason some airports in Muslim areas have dedicated ihram rooms where pilgrims can change into the necessary clothing. If flying with an airline originating from a Muslim majority country, airline staff announce to be in the state of 'ihram' before entering in the boundaries of "Miqat".

See also 
 Eid al-Adha
 Masjid ash-Shajara
 Mut'ah of Hajj

References

External links 

 The Five Pillars of Islam, Hajj (Pilgrimage), The Fifth Pillar of Islam, Holy Sites/Mistakes of Pilgrims - An article on the many different beliefs surrounding the wearing of ihram by Sheikh Dr. Ghanim Saleh Al-Sadlan, professor of Higher Islamic Studies at the Imam Muhammad bin Saud Islamic University.
 Ihram Encyclopædia Britannica online

Hajj
Hajj terminology
Islamic clothing